Big Trouble is a 1986 American comedy film and the last film for director John Cassavetes. The cast reunites Peter Falk and Alan Arkin, costars of The In-Laws, and also features Beverly D'Angelo, Charles Durning and Valerie Curtin.

The film's plot is so similar to that of Double Indemnity that, prior to production, Columbia Pictures requested that Universal Pictures (rightsholder for Double Indemnity) grant a license to reuse the plot of the earlier film. Universal executive Frank Price, who had previously worked at Columbia, was aware that Columbia was holding onto a script called Back to the Future and made a deal to take ownership of the script.

Plot
Leonard Hoffman is a Los Angeles insurance agent with a problem on his hands. He has teenage triplets who are all gifted musicians, but wife Arlene insists that the kids attend college at Yale, requiring more than $40,000 in tuition, rather than less expensive schools like nearby UCLA.

This situation is on Leonard's mind when he pays a business call to the Beverly Hills mansion of Steve and Blanche Rickey. He is met by a flirtatious and scantily clad Blanche, who explains a problem of her own: Steve is dying, with less than a week to live, but accidentally let his life insurance policy lapse.

A scheme is hatched involving a policy with a double-indemnity clause. Steve has to die in an unexpected fashion for this to happen, but he may or may not cooperate.

Cast

Reception
Andrew Bergman wrote the original screenplay and was slated to direct before Cassavetes was hired. Cassavetes disliked the film and called it "the aptly titled 'Big Trouble,'" as the studio vetoed many of his decisions and he disagreed with the manner in which the studio edited the film. Bergman said: "That was a mess. I never fixed the ending, and that was the problem. You’ve got to have it when you get it on the floor. You can’t say, 'Later, we’ll get it straight.' It’s true in every medium. You’ve got to hit the ground running, and we didn’t. I never had the ending straight."

The film had polarizing response; on Rotten Tomatoes, the film has a "Rotten" rating of 17% based on 6 reviews, with an average rating of 4.8/10. On the other hand, on Metacritic, the film has a rating of 70 out of 100 based on 8 reviews, indicating "generally favorable reviews".

References

External links
 

1986 films
1986 comedy films
American comedy films
Columbia Pictures films
1980s English-language films
Films scored by Bill Conti
Films directed by John Cassavetes
1980s American films